The Wishing Tree is a 1975 romance novel by Sandra Paretti.

Plot summary
Camilla had always wished for grand things. It didn't take long for her to learn that it took more than a wish to win one's desire. She had seen her father's mansion built and paid for by dreams, not cash. And then she watched her family's resources dwindle and collapse. Camilla was not going to repeat these mistakes. Married to a realistic and practical young man, she began to build up a business that became the envy of all Berlin. But when an old lover returned after many years absence, Camilla realized her career wasn't everything. Now she wanted something she had never known before. And Camilla was willing to risk everything for this brief moment of passion.

References

External links
 
 DasErste.de:

1975 German novels
German romance novels
German novels adapted into television shows